First Monday Trade Days is a monthly flea market held in Canton, Texas.  The market is actually held on the Thursday through Sunday preceding the first Monday of each month.  It purports to be the largest and oldest continually operated flea market in the United States, and is a highly popular event in the area.  Depending on the time of year, up to 100,000 shoppers frequent the fair in a weekend.

History
First Monday Trade Days began sometime in the 1850s.  As was common in those days, the circuit judge would stop in certain counties on specific days to hold court sessions.  People came to town on those days to see the court proceedings and to conduct business.  Canton (the county seat for Van Zandt County) had its designated day on the first Monday of each month, hence the origin of the name. Since most of Van Zandt County was open range at that time, a state law required that all stray horses be brought into Canton and auctioned to the highest bidder. These horses had been picked up on the range and boarded by the farmers until the day of the auction. People came from all around to participate, and this became known as "First Monday Trades Day", sometimes called "Horse Monday". Soon the people were bringing their own horses to sell or trade, and as the years passed, they began to bring their excess crops, such as fresh produce, grain, and sugar cane syrup.

Some dispute those claims and rely on the legend claiming that during middle nineteenth century, this trades day became an important custom to the rural people. With poor means of communication, people would wait until "First Monday" to come to Canton to see their relatives and friends, to make business arrangements, and to get the local news. During the election years, the politicians would center their campaigns around "First Monday". This event would accumulate more people of the county together at one time than any other function of its time. As the years passed and the population of Canton increased, the crowds at "First Monday" increased too—all without any planning or organization—just naturally. The trading area was on the streets. People would stroll up and down, trading, visiting and transacting their business. The townspeople began to look on the event with disdain, dreading the filth and confusion that cluttered their city. They finally passed a city ordinance prohibiting trade in the streets, but to no avail; the law could not be enforced. The crowds were too large for the small city to disperse. The only hope the city had was hopefully the custom would finally "play out" as had most of the other trades days in Texas. This did not come about.

In the 1930s when the importance of the horse began to decline, it was thought that "First Monday" would vanish. There appeared about a ten-year void in Texas between the horse-raising era and the tractor era, and out of state horse traders began to bring in horses to supply this void. Horse buyers from all over the state began to attend "First Monday" and the crowds got larger and larger. It became known statewide as the place to buy a good "bronc".

Then, in the 1940s, as the tractor came in and horses declined, hog trading took its place. Feeder pigs were raised locally, and soon they gained the reputation of being the cleanest and finest pigs sold anywhere --- cholera free. Buyers came in from all over Texas, Oklahoma, and Arkansas to buy these fine pigs.

Dogs were also a commodity. At first, farmers would bring in strays and unwanted offspring; then the hunters started bringing their hound dogs. Soon the whole town was saturated with hound dogs, some selling for as much as $500. "First Monday" now became known all over the Southwest to dog fanciers as "Dog Monday". One could see anything from a Russian Setter to two types of specialized squirrel dogs (one to hunt gray squirrels and one to hunt fox squirrels). After the event, many of the worthless dogs were released, and Canton found itself flooded with stray dogs; it was soon necessary to hire a dog catcher.

By 1950 the crowds were approaching the 5,000 mark, and space became a problem. One homeowner, a woman who owned a double lot, began patrolling her property with a broom to keep the people off. Finally, one trader offered to rent space from her. Then she started renting her entire area. Soon she was making $75 to $100 every "First Monday". Eventually other homeowners did the same. One widow was offered twenty-five cents for the use of her bathroom, and soon this was a big business too. As space became a premium, the traders began to arrive on Sunday in order to get the best space first. This created more serious problems. The churches began to complain about the congestion and activity on the Lord's Day. Sanitation became a big factor. These people had to stay over night in their cars and trucks because there were not adequate facilities in the small town. It was soon apparent that a city police force was needed to control and maintain order among these visitors.

In the early 1960s, a man was bitten by a dog and died of rabies. A city ordinance was passed prohibiting dogs. The townspeople thought this might stop the trades day. It didn't. An individual bought  of land and began to have the dog trade there on his property. The city did require that they all be vaccinated and kept leashed or penned.

The dog trade flourished, and so did the rest of trades day. With the crowds growing larger and people coming in on Sunday, the Mayor and the City Council decided something had to be done. Rules and regulations had to be enacted, a place found, and some kind of order established. Canton had not encouraged "First Monday" --- actually it had discouraged it --- but the custom had become entrenched into the culture of the people for over 100 years, and it looked as though it was there to stay. It had gained national recognition by this time. Feature stories had appeared in Life, Look, and The Saturday Evening Post. Texas newspapers periodically acclaimed its appeal and uniqueness.

In 1965, the City of Canton began a plan of action. The City did not have the funds to move the trading area so Angus Travis, and Joe Hackney partnered and purchased six and a half acres of land north of the square and designated it as a trading area. The City leased the land from H & T Parking and the area was divided into spaces, and each space was rented for a nominal fee, depending upon the type of merchandise offered for sale or trade. This was a new beginning for an old tradition, with a plan for the future. In a short time, this area became filled to overflowing. As more land could be secured by the City, adjoining the original site, it was bought and developed for use.

Despite numerous and repeated attempts by early city officials to discourage traders from doing business on the streets of the city, First Monday Trade Days continued and flourished.  Eventually Canton realized that it could benefit from the popularity of the market, and purchased a site dedicated to it.

Trade days today
There are various buildings and areas, each designated by name, among them the Original Pavilions, Canton Marketplace, Old Mill Marketplace, The Village, The Mountain, The Arbors and The Dog Alley. There is also an area adjacent to the First Monday Trade Days facility (the one operated by the city) known as 'the Lewis side'. In 2009 Henry Lewis, owner of 'the Lewis side' purchased the Arbors.

The buildings, known as pavilions, house the more established and regular vendors. They are full of the "regulars" who have reserved these spaces for the entire year. Most feature new crafts or products with a decidedly country or western feel. They are popular with shoppers looking for dependability and the modestly higher prices that go along with it. Most vendors in these areas are unwilling to come down much on their prices, but bartering is always welcome.

The Canton Marketplace is the first building which begins the Trade Days market area on Highway 19.  It is a climate controlled indoor pavilion with over 300 vendors who are mostly year round regulars.  This pavilion has slightly more upscale items than the rest of the grounds and a food court.  Despite the upscale feel, you can still find excellent bargains on unique items.  Sometimes you can catch concerts or other free venues during trade days weekend here.  Their restrooms are the best found anywhere on the grounds and there is a winery which offers taste testing.  They have convenient onsite parking, an RV Park, and offer a free trolley transportation to the other First Monday areas.

As of Spring 2014, a 10' x 20' or 14' x 14' booth inside one of the main (buildings 2, 3 and 4) costs approx $200 per weekend (Wednesday afternoon/Thursday morning setup to end-of-show Sunday).

The "unreserved" areas of the market are by far the most interesting and most likely to produce an unexpected treasure. It is "first-come-first-served" in these areas and the vendors who arrive early get the choice shady spots. Anything and everything can be found and there is a definite garage sale feel but with a general nod toward collectibles. The majority of items are old but bargains can be found in current categories such as computer and office supplies, tools, yard art and furniture, and even toys. You never know what you'll find in these sections and valuable items can still be found. This is becoming a bit harder than it used to be because of the advent of eBay and the general increase in knowledge of collectors and sellers.

Just like the material items for sale, food is also abundant and varied. Quality is generally very good but most is on the unhealthy junk food side of the menu. This doesn't mean that one can't eat healthy. There are options available but everyone tends to go with the "I only come once a year" mentality. Canton favorites include cheesecake sundae in a cup, fresh-squeezed lemonade, smoked turkey legs, funnel cakes (pancakey batter drizzled into hot oil through a funnel and covered in powdered sugar), sausage on a stick, corny dogs, kettle corn (mildly sweet popcorn), and wonderful homemade breakfasts. You can snack your way through or sit down to a complete meal. Prices are higher than typical fast food but not unreasonably so.

Despite the large size of the facility, people with disabilities will find easy access, and can even rent a scooter to get around the market area with ease. Be aware however that extremely hot weather can make a big difference in ability to get around.

Because of the income the city receives from operating the facility, until 2006 a city property tax was not required from Canton's residents.

Many residents have also turned struggling farms into support businesses. One such farm located across the main highway turned its land into parking spaces. They now make more from charging drivers to park on their lot for the 4 days of the event than they ever did from farming the same land. By the way, parking as of early 2007 is $5/car almost everywhere. No free parking on city streets is available.

Some advice for new visitors:
 Try to visit on a Thursday or Friday since crowds are slightly lower and selection is best.
 Spring and fall are the most pleasant seasons to visit.
 If you see it and love it, buy it. Don't take the chance on it being there when you return. Being new, you may not find the same booth again. It is easy to get turned around.
 Plan at least 5 hours to make even a cursory "run-through" of the area. Serious shoppers will need 8 hours to 3 days to cover the entire grounds.
 Bargain with the vendors. Even in the more established sections you can never tell who will say yes.
 Take a magnifier and small magnet. They'll come in handy for examining condition and identifying "brass" or "bronze" that is really steel.
 Wear comfortable shoes all the time and clothing appropriate for the season. Almost year 'round—wear sunscreen.
 If you don't know about an expensive collectible, be wary. Fakes and overpricing exist but knowing something about the item can prevent a bad purchase.
 Remember where you park. Even small purchases get heavy when carried over time and distance. You'll want to drop items off in the trunk.

On Friday, May 2, 2008, Canton and First Monday Trade Days were hit by a tornado, that damaged signs, chimneys, vendor's goods, and uprooted several large trees.

In March 2020, for the first time in Trade Days history the Trade Days were canceled for the upcoming April Trade Days, due to the 2019-20 coronavirus pandemic.

Notoriety
Featured in the PBS documentary A Flea Market Documentary produced by WQED, Pittsburgh, Pennsylvania.

References

External links
 KWJB RADIO broadcasting from the First Monday Trade Days grounds
 Discounts, Coupons, Free Parking Passes, Loyalty Cards and more
 Canton Trade Days
 800 Vendors & More
 First Monday Discount Cards
 Old West shopping area of First Monday
 Find Lodging for First Monday Trade Days
 Discount Parking Pass
 First Monday Trade Days Vendor Locator
 Video Tour of First Monday Trade Days
 Canton Texas Flea Market
 WQED page for A Flea Market Documentary
 First Monday Trade Days Dates
 Interactive Search Enabled Map
 Canton Texas and First Monday Trade Days
 First Monday Indoor Canton Marketplace

Tourist attractions in Van Zandt County, Texas
Retail markets in the United States
Flea markets